Robert Kennedy and His Times is a 1985 American television miniseries directed by Marvin J. Chomsky, based on the 1978 Robert F. Kennedy biography of the same name by Arthur M. Schlesinger, Jr.

Cast

Awards and nominations

See also
 Cultural depictions of John F. Kennedy

References

External links 
 

1980s American television miniseries
1985 television films
1985 films
American biographical series
Television shows based on books
CBS network films
Films scored by Fred Karlin
Films about Robert F. Kennedy
Cultural depictions of John F. Kennedy
Cultural depictions of Lyndon B. Johnson
Cultural depictions of Robert F. Kennedy
Cultural depictions of Jimmy Hoffa
Cultural depictions of Joseph McCarthy
Cultural depictions of J. Edgar Hoover
Cultural depictions of Jacqueline Kennedy Onassis
Films directed by Marvin J. Chomsky